I'm Gay (I'm Happy) is the fifth studio album by American rapper Lil B. The album was released digitally on June 29, 2011. On June 30, 2011, the rapper provided a free download link on his Twitter account. The album entered the Billboard's R&B/Hip-Hop Albums chart at number 56 and the Heatseekers Albums chart at number 20 for the week of July 16, 2011. The album's cover is an allusion to Marvin Gaye's 1976 album, I Want You.

Critical reception

I'm Gay (I'm Happy) received positive reviews; fans commented on the album's wide variety of positive messages and also the unique beats and lyrical styles not common to mainstream hip-hop. Lil B rapped about many controversial issues in the album including race relations, poverty, humanity and the justice system. The album, according to many fans, shows the "true" side of Lil B, many noting the album's inspirational theme. I'm Gay received generally positive reviews from music critics. At Metacritic, which assigns a weighted mean rating out of 100 to reviews from mainstream critics, the album received an average score of 73, based on 10 reviews. Lil B was the subject of controversy because upon the album's release he decided to provide a free version via a download link on Facebook. Many believed this to be a publicity stunt; however, he cleared the controversy when on his Facebook page he posted: "for all my fans who don't have 10 dollars to buy my album, here it is for free."

Accolades

Controversy
Lil B was criticized for deciding to name his album I'm Gay, even receiving death threats at one point. Many saw the move as a publicity stunt; however, the rapper has said that the title is meant to be used as the formal definition of 'gay' (merry) and as a message of support to the LGBT community. He states it simply means "I'm Happy". After all the controversy and receiving death threats, he added "I'm Happy" in parentheses to the title.

Track listing

Samples
 "Trapped in Prison" contains a sample of "Leaving Shire" by Bo Hansson.
 "Open Thunder Eternal Slumber" contains a sample of "Catch the Breeze" by Slowdive.
 "Game" contains a sample of "Of All the Things" by Stephanie Mills
 "Unchain Me" contains a sample of "Cry Little Sister" by Gerard McMann.
 "Neva Stop Me" contains a sample of "Quasimodo's Marriage" by Alec R. Costandinos.
 "Gon Be Okay" contains a sample of "One Summer's Day" by Joe Hisaishi.
 "The Wilderness" contains a sample of "Futari Dake No Ceremony" by Yukiko Okada.
 "I Hate Myself" contains a sample of Boyz II Men's cover of "Iris" by Goo Goo Dolls.
 "Get It While It's Good" contains a sample of "Dreaming" by Bill Summers.
 "I Seen That Light" contains a sample of "Lost in Time" by Eric Benet.
 "My Last Chance" contains a sample of "Still Waiting" by Johnny Gill.

Charts

References

2011 albums
Lil B albums
Amalgam Digital albums
Albums free for download by copyright owner
LGBT-related controversies in music